"The Wild Colonial Boy" is a traditional anonymously penned Irish-Australian folk ballad which tells the story of a bushranger in early colonial Australia who dies during a gunfight with local police. Versions of the ballad give different names for the bushranger involved: some based on real individuals and some apparently fictional. A common theme is romanticisation of the bushranger's battle against colonial authority. According to a report in The Argus in November 1880, Ann Jones, the innkeeper of the Glenrowan Hotel, had asked her son to sing the ballad when the Kelly gang were at her hotel in June that year.

Identity of the bushranger
Versions of the ballad depict bushrangers with the first name of "Jack" and surnames such as "Dolan," "Doolan," "Duggan" and "Donahue." It is unclear if the ballad originally referred to an actual person. 

One possible origin is Jack Donahue (also spelled Donohoe), an 1820s Irish convict who sent to Australia, became a bushranger and was killed by police. Another possibility is that the song refers to an 1860s juvenile Australian convict named John Doolan, who was born in Castlemaine, Victoria, and also turned to bushranging. However the real Doolan was not shot by police, instead being captured and sentenced to an additional convict term. It is also possible that the identities of the histories of Donohue and Doolan became blended over time to produce the modern ballad's lyrics.

Lyrics and melodie

'Tis of a wild Colonial Boy, Jack Doolan was his name,
Of poor but honest parents he was born in Castlemaine.
He was his father's only hope, his mother's pride and joy,
And dearly did his parents love the wild Colonial Boy.

Chorus
Come, all my hearties, we'll roam the mountains high,
Together we will plunder, together we will die.
We'll wander over valleys, and gallop over plains,
And we'll scorn to live in slavery, bound down with iron chains.

He was scarcely sixteen years of age when he left his father's home,
And through Australia's sunny clime a bushranger did roam.
He robbed those wealthy squatters, their stock he did destroy,
And a terror to Australia was the wild Colonial Boy.

In sixty-one this daring youth commenced his wild career,
With a heart that knew no danger, no foeman did he fear.
He stuck up the Beechworth mail-coach, and robbed Judge MacEvoy,
Who trembled, and gave up his gold to the wild Colonial Boy.

He bade the judge "Good morning", and told him to beware,
That he'd never rob a hearty chap that acted on the square,
And never to rob a mother of her son and only joy,
Or else you might turn outlaw, like the wild Colonial Boy.

One day as he was riding the mountain-side along,
A-listening to the little birds, their pleasant laughing song,
Three mounted troopers rode along – Kelly, Davis and FitzRoy –
They thought that they would capture him, the wild Colonial Boy.

"Surrender now, Jack Doolan, you see there's three to one.
Surrender now, Jack Doolan, you're a daring highwayman."
He drew a pistol from his belt, and shook the little toy,
"I'll fight, but not surrender," said the wild Colonial Boy.
 
He fired at Trooper Kelly and brought him to the ground,
And in return from Davis received a mortal wound.
All shattered through the jaws he lay still firing at FitzRoy,
And that's the way they captured him – the wild Colonial Boy.

In popular culture

"The Wild Colonial Boy" has been recorded by Rolf Harris, Larry Kirwan, John Doyle, The Irish Rovers, The Brothers Four, Oliver Reed and The Clancy Brothers, among others, and was featured in the film The Quiet Man. The album Ireland in Song by Cathy Maguire also includes the Irish version of the song. 
 In the United States, a version of this song was popularized by folk singer Burl Ives.
 Dr. Hook recorded a version of this song on American Bandstand (1981). It was mentioned by Dennis Locorriere that the royalties went to charity. The song peaked at number 4 on the Australian singles chart.
 Billy Walker recorded the song as B-side to his hit, "Charlie's Shoes", in 1962. He included it in his album Greatest Hits. 
 The walking skeleton in Robert Frost's poem "The Witch of Coos" is said to have been searching for a way out of the house, because he wanted to sing his favorite song, "The Wild Colonial Boy", in the snow.
 Mick Jagger sings this song in the 1970 movie Ned Kelly, which is about the real-life Australian outlaw of the same name.
 The Pogues and The Dubliners released "Jack's Heroes", a 1990 single celebrating the Republic of Ireland national football team, which uses the tune of "The Wild Colonial Boy".
 A waltz version of the tune features in the ball scene in Baz Luhrmann's film Australia (2008).
 Damien Leith released a version on his 2015 album Songs from Ireland.
 Sung by Paddy Carmody  (Robert Mitchum), in the hotel scene of the 1960 movie The Sundowners.

References

Further reading
 "The Wild Colonial Boy", Paul Slade, May 2019

External links

Australian folk songs
Australian poems
Traditional ballads
Irish folk songs
Year of song unknown
Irish-Australian culture
Songs about criminals
Songs about Australia